Logan MacMillan (born July 5, 1989) is a Canadian former professional ice hockey centre who last played for the Manchester Storm of the Elite Ice Hockey League (EIHL). He was selected by the Anaheim Ducks of the National Hockey League (NHL) 19th overall in the 2007 NHL Entry Draft. MacMillan is the son of former NHL player Bob MacMillan.

Playing career
MacMillan was drafted in the first round, 19th overall, by the Anaheim Ducks in the 2007 NHL Entry Draft. He captained Team Atlantic at the 2006 World Under-17 Hockey Challenge, posting six points (3-3-6). On December 23, 2008, MacMillan was traded by the Halifax Mooseheads to the Rimouski Océanic for Guillaume Pelletier and four draft picks.

On June 30, 2010, MacMillan was traded by the Ducks to the Calgary Flames in exchange for winger Jason Jaffray and future considerations. In his two seasons within the Flames organization, MacMillan was assigned to the Flames affiliates the Abbotsford Heat of the AHL and the Utah Grizzlies of the ECHL.

On August 7, 2012, MacMillan signed his first European contract with Dornbirner EC of the Austrian Hockey League (EBEL) for the 2012–13 season.

Career statistics

Regular season and playoffs

International

References

External links

1989 births
Living people
Abbotsford Heat players
Anaheim Ducks draft picks
Athol Murray College of Notre Dame alumni
Bakersfield Condors (1998–2015) players
Canadian ice hockey centres
Canadian expatriate ice hockey players in England
Halifax Mooseheads players
Sportspeople from Charlottetown
Ice hockey people from Prince Edward Island
Manchester Storm (2015–) players
National Hockey League first-round draft picks
Nottingham Panthers players
Rimouski Océanic players
Utah Grizzlies (ECHL) players